Agdistis criocephala is a moth in the family Pterophoridae. It is known from South Africa and Namibia.

References

Agdistinae
Moths of Africa
Plume moths of Africa
Moths described in 1909